Expert Review of Gastroenterology & Hepatology is a peer-reviewed medical journal covering all aspects of gastroenterology and hepatology. It was established in 2007 and is published by Informa.

Abstracting and indexing 
The journal is abstracted and indexed in:

According to the Journal Citation Reports, the journal has a 2018 impact factor of 2.991.

References

External links 
 

English-language journals
Expert Review journals
Gastroenterology and hepatology journals
Publications established in 2007